Orion was a  74-gun ship of the line of the French Navy.

Career 
In 1790, Orion was under Buor de La Charoulière.

She took part in fighting on the coast of Italy. In 1793, she was renamed Mucius Scævola, soon shortened to Mucius.

In 1794 she took part in the battle of the Glorious First of June (Combat du 13 prairial an II), helping the  battling , as well as in both the First Battle of Groix and the Battle of Groix in June 1795.

In December 1796 she took part in the Expédition d'Irlande, an attempt at landing an army in Ireland, before being struck and broken up in Brest.

Sources and references 
 Notes

Citations

References
 
  (1671-1870)

Ships of the line of the French Navy
Téméraire-class ships of the line
1787 ships
Ships built in France